Dafydd ab Ieuan ab Iorwerth (died no later than 1503) was Bishop of St Asaph from 1500 to 1503.

His family was from the Trefor area of Gwynedd, and descendants of Tudur ap Rhys Sais.

Prior to his appointment he was Abbot of Valle Crucis. He provided hospitality to, and was liberal patron of the bards, as acknowledged by Gutun Owain and Guto'r Glyn.

References 

Welsh bishops
1503 deaths
Bishops of St Asaph